Lesław Marian Bartelski (September 8, 1920 – March 27, 2006) was a Polish writer, perhaps best known for his work, Warsaw Ghetto Thermopolye and his novel The Blood-stained Wings.

Early life
Bartelski was born in Warsaw, where he spent most of his life. During World War II, he was member of the Polish resistance (1941–1945), fighting against Nazi occupation. During the war, he wrote for the underground magazine Sztuka i Naród (Art and Nation), beginning his literary career. In 1944, as a member of the Home Army he fought in the Warsaw Uprising.

Literary career
After the war, Bartelski studied law at Warsaw University, and began a writing career. He was active in a large number of organizations, including Polish Writer's Association (where he served as the Chair of its Warsaw branch from 1972 to 1978). Over his career, he won numerous awards for his work, including the Prize of Minister of Defense (2nd class) in 1969, Pietrzak Prize in 1969 and 1985, Warsaw Prize in 1969, Prize of Minister Culture and Art (1st class) in 1977, Prize of president of Warsaw in 1990 and Reymont Prize in 1988

Publications
1951 – Ludzie zza rzeki (People Behind the River)
1958 – Pejzaż dwukrotny (Double Landscape)
1962 – Złota mahmudija (Golden Mahmudiha)
1964 – Wodorosty (Seaweeds)
1968 – Dialog z cieniem (Dialogue with a Shadow)
1973 – Niedziela bez dzwonów (Sunday without Bells)
1975 – Krwawe skrzydła (The Blood-stained Wings)
1978 – Rajski ogród (The Garden of Eden)

References

1920 births
2006 deaths
Writers from Warsaw
Polish male writers
Home Army members
Recipients of the Order of the Banner of Work
Knights of the Order of Polonia Restituta
Officers of the Order of Polonia Restituta
Commanders of the Order of Polonia Restituta
Recipients of the Cross of Valour (Poland)
Recipients of the Armia Krajowa Cross
Commanders with Star of the Order of Polonia Restituta
Recipients of the State Award Badge (Poland)